The list of shipwrecks in 1929 includes ships sunk, foundered, grounded, or otherwise lost during 1929.

January

2 January

3 January

4 January

5 January

7 January

9 January

11 January

14 January

15 January

16 January

18 January

19 January

20 January

21 January

22 January

23 January

24 January

25 January

28 January

29 January

30 January

Unknown date

February

1 February

2 February

3 February

4 February

5 February

6 February

7 February

9 February

11 February

12 February

13 February

14 February

15 February

19 February

19 February

21 February

22 February

23 February

24 February

25 February

26 February

27 February

28 February

March

1 March

2 March

3 March

5 March

6 March

7 March

8 March

10 March

11 March

12 March

13 March

14 March

18 March

20 March

21 March

22 March

24 March

25 March

26 March

27 March

28 March

29 March

30 March

31 March

Unknown date

April

5 April

6 April

7 April

8 April

11 April

12 April

13 April

14 April

17 April

18 April

20 April

22 April

25 April

27 April

29 April

Unknown date

May

2 May

3 May

4 May

5 May

10 May

12 May

15 May

26 May

27 May

28 May

June

3 June

4 June

7 June

10 June

11 June

14 June

16 June

17 June

21 June

24 June

25 June

27 June

July

1 July

2 July

5 July

7 July

8 July

9 July

10 July

11 July

12 July

13 July

15 July

16 July

17 July

19 July

21 July

22 July

23 July

24 July

26 July

29 July

30 July

31 July

August

3 August

4 August

5 August

6 August

8 August

9 August

11 August

14 August

16 August

17 August

18 August

19 August

20 August

22 August

25 August

26 August

27 August

29 August

31 August

Unknown date

September

1 September

2 September

3 September

4 September

5 September

7 September

8 September

9 September

10 September

11 September

12 September
For the loss of the British collier King Cadwallon on this day, see the entry for 10 July 1929.

14 September
For the loss of the American cargo ship Golden Forest on this day, see the entry for 26 July 1929.

17 September

20 September

21 September

23 September

24 September

25 September

26 September

27 September

28 September

30 September

Unknown date

October

2 October

3 October

5 October

6 October

7 October

8 October

10 October

11 October

12 October

13 October

14 October

15 October

16 October

17 October

19 October

20 October

21 October

22 October

25 October

28 October

29 October

30 October

31 October

Unknown

November

1 November

3 November

4 November

5 November

5 November

6 November

7 November

8 November

9 November

10 November

11 November

12 November

13 November

14 November

15 November

17 November

18 November

19 November

20 November

22 November

23 November

25 November

28 November
}

29 November

30 November

December

1 December

2 December

3 December

4 December

5 December

6 December

7 December

8 December

9 December

10 December

12 December

13 December

14 December

15 December

17 December

18 December

20 December

21 December

22 December

23 December

24 December

25 December

26 December

27 December

28 December

29 December

30 December

31 December

Unknown date

References

1929
 
Ships